Madrona may refer to:

Places

Canada
 Madrona Island, an island in the Johnstone Strait region of the Central Coast of British Columbia
 Madrona Point, on the east coast of Vancouver Island, British Columbia between the communities of Parksville and Nanoose Bay
 Madrona Bay, part of Ganges Harbour on Saltspring Island, British Columbia
 Madrona School, a not-for-profit independent school in Vancouver, British Columbia

Spain
 Madrona, a village in the municipality of Pinell de Solsonès in Catalonia
 Madrona (Segovia), a village in the municipality of Segovia in Castile and León

United States
 Madrona, Seattle, a neighborhood in Seattle, Washington

Saints
 Saint Madrona, or Madron (Saint), a patron of the church at Madron, Cornwall, United Kingdom
 Madrona of Barcelona, a saint of the Roman Catholic Church, born in Thessaloniki and venerated in Barcelona

Other uses
 Arbutus, a genus of flowering tree whose North American members are called "Madrones"
 USCGC Madrona (WLB-302), a U. S. Coast Guard seagoing buoy tender

See also
 Madrona School
 Madrone (disambiguation)
 Madroño (disambiguation)